Mohamed Mahmoud (Arabic: محمد محمود, born March 24, 1985), aka Nano, is an Egyptian footballer who currently plays for Wadi Degla Sporting Club. Left-footed, he plays as a central defender or defensive midfielder.

External links
Al Ahly profile

1985 births
Living people
Egyptian footballers
Association football defenders
Association football midfielders
Al Ahly SC players
Egyptian Premier League players